National Highway 227A, commonly referred to as NH 227A is a national highway in  India. It is a spur road of National Highway 27. NH-227A traverses the states of Bihar and Uttar Pradesh in India.

Route 
Uttar Pradesh
Ayodhya - Chhawni - Kalwadi - Barhalganj - Barhaj - Bihar Border - 218 km.
Bihar
Uttar Pradesh Border - Siwan - Mehsi - 111.3 km.

Junctions  

  Terminal near Ayodhya.
  Terminal near Mehsi.

See also 

 List of National Highways in India
 List of National Highways in India by state

References

External links 

 NH 227A on OpenStreetMap

National highways in India
National Highways in Bihar
National Highways in Uttar Pradesh